Chaqa Zard Baghi (also Romanized as Chaqā Zard Bāghī, Cheqā Zard-e Bāghī, and Choqā Zard-e Bāghī; also known as Cheqā Zard and Chīa Zard) is a village in Chaqa Narges Rural District, Mahidasht District, Kermanshah County, Kermanshah Province, Iran. At the 2006 census, its population was 51, in 11 families.

References 

Populated places in Kermanshah County